George Tuckett may refer to:

George Tuckett (politician) (1873–1963), Australian politician
George Elias Tuckett (1835–1900), New Zealand politician